"I'm in Love" is an English language song by Swedish singer Ola Svensson and his first international hit with his major success in the Italian Singles Chart reaching number four, in addition to appearing in the German and Australian Singles Charts. The song was co-written by Alexander Kronlund, Johan Bobäck, Shellback, Dimitri Stassos, Mikaela Stenström and Svensson himself, while being produced by Italian DJs/producers Pasquale Verrigni and Mohammed Ben Khalifa, better known under the alias Two Lions. The song is featured on Ola's album Carelessly Yours and also serves as the album's lead single.

Versions
"I'm In Love" (Radio Edit) (3:21)	
"I'm In Love" (Bodybangers Remix) (5:12)
"I'm In Love" (Club Junkies vs JRMX Remix) (6:50)
"I'm In Love" (Nino Fish Remix) (4:44)

Charts

References

2010 singles
Number-one singles in Sweden
Ola Svensson songs
2010 songs
Columbia Records singles
Songs written by Alexander Kronlund
Songs written by Johan Bobäck
Songs written by Shellback (record producer)
Songs written by Dimitri Stassos
Songs written by Ola Svensson